Marc Burty (18 February 1827, Lyon – 2 February 1903, Lyon) was a French composer and music teacher for Lycée de Lyon who also went by the pseudonym, Georges Bull, in some of his works. He became interested in the harmonium after building a relationship with Alfred Lefébure-Wély in Paris who introduced him to the instruments, in which Burty later taught the instrument in the Lyon-based institution. He mainly wrote music pieces for the piano and were published in Paris between 1859 and 1900.

Legacy
In America, his works were considered to be well-adapted for teaching purposes.

Compositions
(Most of the catalogue is from Marc Burty's entry in the Bibliothèque nationale de France.)
A la belle étoile
Au gré du vent
Au pays de Bohème
Au Temps passé, gavotte pour piano
Aubade à Grand'maman
Aux Alpes
batteurs de blé
Bonhomme Jadis
Chanson de chasse
Chant du Soldat. Romance dramatique. Paroles de Léon Rayssac
Charité divine. Mélodie. Paroles de F. Barrillot
De profundis d'amour
Dernier soleil
îles d'or
Il faut partir
Jeune France
Lutins et farfadets
Menuet villageois
Noces de Figaro de W. A. Mozart fantaisie transcription [pour piano], op. 34
L'Oiseau du Paradis
Pas d'armes marche des chevaliers, pour piano à 4 mains
Pauvre Isabeau
Pendant l'étape
Perle de Cadix
Petit Noël, chant des bergers
Petite fanfare, marche
Petite reine
Pied d'alouette, caprice-polka
Pizzicato
Polka mazurka de la dame de carreau pour le piano
Pour endormir l'enfant. Berceuse. Paroles de Madame Desbordes-Valmore
Premières neiges mazurka pour piano
Princesse des Canaries fantaisie espagnole pour piano, op. 35
Pupilles du régiment, pas redoublé
Quand viendra la saison nouvelle Villanelle. Poésie de Théophile Gautier
Reine des bois styrienne pour piano
Retraite russe
Révérences de cour, menuet
Robe et jeune fille. Paroles de S. et F. Borel
Roche aux mouettes. Grande valse brillante pour piano par P. Granger. Edition à 4 mains par Marc Burty
Rose de mai valse légère pour piano
Rose de Noël, mazurka
Sage et le fou
Sans façon, galop
Scènes et paysages. 30 morceaux faciles pour piano par Georges Bull et Marc Burty
Simples croquis [pour piano]
Sonatines
Souvenir de Petsth fantaisie polka, caprice hongrois pour piano
Transcription brillante sur "Le jour et la nuit"
Tribut de Zamora, opéra de Ch. Gounod, fantaisie brillante pour piano. Op. 32
Troïka mazurka russe pour piano 6 mains
Trompettes et clairons fanfare pour piano à 4 mains
Tu me regretteras ! Mélodie. Paroles de Ph. Théolier
Vers la rive fleurie, marine
Vieilles dentelles, menuet pour piano
vieux monsieur de l'orchestre. Scène Comique.... Paroles de H. Lefebvre
Vin blanc. Paroles de Camille Roy
Vous feriez pleurer le Bon Dieu mélodie. Poésie de F. Barrillot
Warther, drame lyrique de J. Massonet, petite transcription très facile [pour piano]
Yvan, chanson cosaque

Notes

References

External links
 
 
 En Chasse (Les petites concertantes, Op.179), as Georges Bull

1827 births
1903 deaths
French composers
French musicians
Musicians from Lyon
Pseudonymous writers